Johanne Falardeau (born 1961) is a retired Canadian badminton player. Falardeau is the first ever women's doubles player from her country to win a gold medal at the Commonwealth Games. Additionally, she won a silver and bronze in the same discipline, too. She is also a former Pan American champion and became the national champion for seven times between 1982 and 1990.

Introduced to badminton at the age of ten by Jean-Claude Laprise, Falardeau has experienced a meteoric progression. Became Provincial junior champion in under ninenteen category three years later, and made it to the national team at the age of 15. The following year, she won the triple crown (singles, doubles, mixed) at the Canadian Junior Championships. Her first international success came at the 1978 Commonwealth Games where she won silver medal in mixed team event. 1979, she became Pan American champion in both singles and mixed team events. Reaching finals multiple times in international tournaments, she became champion in French Open, U. S. Open, Canada Open and Victor Cup and had some second best performances in Bells Open, Scottish Open and Carlton Cup as well.

Achievements

Commonwealth Games

IBF World Grand Prix 
The World Badminton Grand Prix sanctioned by International Badminton Federation (IBF) from 1983 to 2006.

International tournaments

IBF International

References

External links 

1961 births
Living people
20th-century Canadian women
Canadian female badminton players
Badminton players at the 1978 Commonwealth Games
Badminton players at the 1982 Commonwealth Games
Badminton players at the 1986 Commonwealth Games
Badminton players at the 1990 Commonwealth Games
Commonwealth Games gold medallists for Canada
Commonwealth Games silver medallists for Canada
Commonwealth Games bronze medallists for Canada
Commonwealth Games medallists in badminton
21st-century Canadian women
Medallists at the 1978 Commonwealth Games
Medallists at the 1982 Commonwealth Games
Medallists at the 1986 Commonwealth Games
Medallists at the 1990 Commonwealth Games